Slikiai (formerly) is a village in Kėdainiai district municipality, in Kaunas County, in central Lithuania. According to the 2011 census, the village had a population of 83 people. A railway station (Slikių GS) is located next to the village. There is an ancient cemetery site and a memorial monument to the local partisans of the Vytis military district.

Demography

Images

References

Villages in Kaunas County
Kėdainiai District Municipality